James Arthur Carlin (February 23, 1918 – November 29, 2003) was a  Major League Baseball outfielder.

Biography
Carlin attended college at Southeastern Louisiana University. Carlin served in the military during World War II. He died on November 29, 2003 in Birmingham, Alabama. His interment was located in Oakland Cemetery.

References

1918 births
2003 deaths
Philadelphia Phillies players
Baseball players from Alabama
Major League Baseball outfielders
Enterprise Browns players
Helena Seaporters players
Richmond Colts players
Cordele Reds players
Charlotte Hornets (baseball) players
Greenville Spinners players
Springfield Nationals players
Atlanta Crackers players
Montgomery Rebels players
Enterprise Boll Weevils players
Gadsden Chiefs players
Southeastern Louisiana Lions baseball players
United States Navy personnel of World War II
Military personnel from Alabama